Harvey Marlatt (born August 26, 1948) is a former professional basketball player for the Detroit Pistons from 1970-1972. He played in 61 games as a Piston and scored 225 points. Before joining the Pistons, he played basketball for Eastern Michigan University. Marlatt ranks fifth on the all time EMU scoring list with 1680 points scored. He was inducted into the EMU Sports Hall of Fame in 1979.

Marlatt is the lowest drafted player (in terms of selection number) to have ever played in the NBA.

External links

1948 births
Living people
American men's basketball players
Basketball players from Michigan
Detroit Pistons draft picks
Detroit Pistons players
Eastern Michigan Eagles men's basketball players
People from Alpena County, Michigan
Shooting guards